The 2017 New Brunswick Scotties Tournament of Hearts, the provincial women's curling championship of New Brunswick was held January 25 to 29 at the Miramichi Curling Club in Miramichi, New Brunswick.  The winning Melissa Adams team represented New Brunswick at the 2017 Scotties Tournament of Hearts in St. Catharines, Ontario.

Melissa Adams of Fredericton would win her first ever provincial Scotties title. She had previously won the 1998 World Junior Curling Championships. Adams had scored four points in the sixth end to defeat Saint John's Sarah Mallais rink in the final by a score of 9-6. The Adams rink represented New Brunswick at the national Scotties, where they had to compete in a pre-qualifying tournament against the Yukon, Nunavut and Northwest Territories to enter the main event. After going 3-0 in the round robin portion, they lost the final to the Northwest Territories and didn't enter the main draw.

Teams
The teams are listed as follows:

Round robin standings

Scores
Draw 1
Adams 8-3 Graham
Mallais 9-7 Park
Robichaud 5-4 Tatlock

Draw 2
Mallais 5-2 Tatlock
Comeau 7-4 Robichaud
Graham 6-5 Park

Draw 3
Adams 9-2 Park
Graham 4-3 Tatlock
Mallais 8-2 Comeau

Draw 4
Robichaud 7-4 Graham
Comeau 9-4 Adams
Park 6-3 Tatlock

Draw 5
Comeau 8-4 Tatlock
Robichaud 9-6 Park
Adams 6-5 Mallais

Draw 6
Mallais 6-4 Robichaud
Adams 8-2 Tatlock
Comeau 12-5 Graham

Draw 7
Comeau 9-2 Park
Mallais 7-5 Graham
Robichaud 6-5 Adams

Tiebreaker
Adams 7-4 Robichaud

Playoffs

Semifinal
Sunday, January 29, 9:00 am

Final
Sunday, January 29, 2:00 pm

References

http://www.curlingzone.com/event.php?view=Main&eventid=4655

2017 in New Brunswick
New Brunswick
January 2017 sports events in Canada
Curling competitions in New Brunswick
Sport in Miramichi, New Brunswick